was a Japanese poet, playwright, essayist, children's literature writer, and translator. She is most well known for her poem, written twelve years after the Japanese defeat in WWII. In 1953, she co-founded the literary journal Kai ("Oars"). She began to learn Korean as a second language at the age of fifty, going on to publish her own translations of poetry by her Korean contemporaries.

Biography

Early life
Noriko Ibaragi was born in Osaka City, Osaka Prefecture and spent her childhood in Nishio City, Aichi Prefecture. In 1943, she entered the Imperial Women's Pharmaceutical College (now Tōhō University) in Tokyo. During her years at the College, she lived through the turmoils of WWII, experiencing air raids and hunger. In 1945, at the age of 19, she heard the broadcast announcing Japanese defeat while working as a mobilized student in a Navy medical supplies factory. Her experiences during the war are recounted in her best-known poem, Watashi ga ichiban kirei datta toki, which expresses her pain at having spent her youth in wartime. The poem was written twelve years later; an English translation was later set to music as "When I Was Most Beautiful" by American folk musician Pete Seeger. She graduated from the College in September 1946.

Career
After seeing A Midsummer Night's Dream at the Imperial Theatre, Ibaragi decided to become a playwright.

In 1950, she married Miura Yasunobu, a physician, and moved to Tokorozawa in Saitama and began submitting her works to the  magazine. Her poetry,  was selected for publication on the September volume in 1950.

In 1953, she co-founded the poetry journal Kai (Oars) with Hiroshi Kawasaki, another writer for Shigaku. Although the first volume of Kai only included works by Ibaragi and Kawasaki, they recruited luminaries Shuntarō Tanikawa, Yūjirō Funaoka, Hiroshi Yoshino, and Hiroshi Mizuo as contributors.

In 1976, at the age of fifty, Ibaragi decided to learn Korean as a second language. She corresponded with the Korean poet Hong Yun-suk while learning Korean, writing that she thought the "theft of language" during the Japanese occupation of Korea was a crime, in reference to Hong being educated in Japanese. She was awarded a Yomiuri Prize for her translation of Korean poems in 1990.

Her poetry collection  published in 1999 was featured on the 16 October edition of Asahi Shimbun, and sold a record breaking one hundred and fifty thousand copies.

Death
Ibaragi died on 19 February 2006 from a brain hemorrhage. As she lived alone, she was discovered in her bed two days later. She had already prepared a will three months earlier; she had also written out a farewell letter and had it printed, ready to send to some two hundred of her friends and correspondents.

Works

Poetry collections
 , 1958
 , 1999

References

Japanese writers
Japanese poets
Japanese women poets
Japanese children's writers
Japanese essayists
Japanese translators
20th-century translators
People from Osaka
Yomiuri Prize winners
1926 births
2006 deaths
20th-century women writers
20th-century essayists